Speleon is a genus of antlions, that is, the genus belongs to the family Myrmeleontidae.

The genus was first described by Miller and Stange in 2012. Despite frequently being referred to as "cave dwelling," Miller and Strange describe them as not being true cave-dwelling antlions, because  not all life stages are confined to caves.

Species
These species belong to the genus Speleon:
 Speleon cavernicolus Miller and Stange, 2012 
 Speleon pilliga Miller and Stange, 2012 
 Speleon yallingup Miller and Stange, 2012

References

Myrmeleontidae